Sollentuna Municipality is a municipality in Stockholm County in east-central Sweden, north of Stockholm. Its seat of local government is located in Tureberg, which is a part of Sollentuna  urban area.

Geography 
Sollentuna borders the municipalities of Solna, Sundbyberg, Stockholm, Järfälla, Upplands Väsby, Täby and Danderyd in clockwise order starting to the south.

Localities and districts 
Since 1995 the bulk of the built-up area of the municipality is statistically counted to the multimunicipal city of Stockholm. A few houses on the eastern border (with about 10 inh.) are in Täby urban area. Sjöberg is constituting a locality of its own.

The municipality is subdivided into the following districts according to population as of 31 December 2021 Befolkningsstatistik

Tureberg, 19 127 inhabitants
Rotebro,  8 824
Helenelund, 12 678
Edsberg, 12 338
Viby, 5,748
Sjöberg, 4,705
Häggvik, 5 518
Norrviken, 3,349
Vaxmora, 2,635
Järvafältet, 186
Total 75 108

Lakes

Central to the landscape of Sollentuna are the rather big lakes Norrviken and Edsviken—the latter a bay of the Baltic Sea.

Edsviken and Norrviken are popular lakes for ice tour skating during the winter. The municipality plows a 15 km long skating track on Norrviken. Note that Norrviken is also the name of a district at the western shore of the Norrviken lake.

Other lakes:     
Fjäturen
Ravalen
Rösjön
Väsjön
Översjön
Snuggan
 Djupan

History
Sollentuna municipality was founded in conjunction with the reform of local government in Sweden in 1863. However, its boundaries are almost  equivalent to those of Sollentuna Parish, which dates back to the 12th century. Well into the 20th century, Sollentuna was a predominantly rural area.

Modern Sollentuna evolved around the railway between Uppsala and Stockholm, inaugurated in 1866. Five of the eight districts that make up the municipality today correspond to railway stations, now operated by Stockholm commuter rail system. From south to north: Helenelund, Tureberg (railway station is Sollentuna Station), Häggvik, Norrviken and Rotebro. Viby is an extension of Norrviken and the two remaining districts— Edsberg and Sjöberg—are found along the road to Danderyd. Other roads into Sollentuna includes the road from Kallhäll to Rotebro and the E 4 motorway that approximates the same route as the railway.

Sollentuna received the title of a merchant town (köping) in 1944. Köping status was made obsolete by the municipal reform of 1971.

Demography

Population development

Income and Education
The population in Sollentuna Municipality has the 11th highest median income per capita in Sweden. The share of highly educated persons, according to Statistics Sweden's definition: persons with post-secondary education that is three years or longer, is 40.7% (national average: 27.0%) and the 9th highest in the country.

Residents with a foreign background
On the 31st of December 2017, the number of people with a foreign background (persons born outside of Sweden or with two parents born outside of Sweden) was 23 284, or 32.41% of the population (71 848 on the 31st of December 2017). On the 31st of December 2002, the number of residents with a foreign background was (per the same definition) 12 443, or 21.26% of the population (58 515 on the 31st of December 2002). On 31 December 2017, there were 71 848 residents in Sollentuna, of which 17 657 people (24.58%) were born in a country other than Sweden. Divided by country in the table below - the Nordic countries, as well as the 12 most common countries of birth outside of Sweden for Swedish residents have been included, with other countries of birth bundled together by continent by Statistics Sweden.

2022 by district
This is a demographic table based on Sollentuna Municipality's electoral districts in the 2022 Swedish general election sourced from SVT's election platform, in turn taken from SCB official statistics.

Residents include everyone registered as living in the district, regardless of age or citizenship status. Valid voters indicate Swedish citizens above the age of 18 who therefore can vote in general elections. Left vote and right vote indicate the result between the two major blocs in said district in the 2022 general election. Employment indicates the share of people between the ages of 20 and 64 who are working taxpayers. Foreign background denotes residents either born abroad or with two parents born outside of Sweden. Median income is the received monthly income through either employment, capital gains or social grants for the median adult above 20, also including pensioners in Swedish kronor. College graduates indicates any degree accumulated after high school.

There were 74,969 residents and 52,341 Swedish citizens of voting age. 48.3 % voted for the left coalition and 50.0 % for the right coalition.

Politics and government

Sollentuna Municipality has a municipal assembly with 61 members elected by proportional representation through municipal elections, held in conjunction with the national parliamentary elections every four years. The assembly elects a municipal board, (kommunstyrelse) which is the municipality's main governing body, chaired by the Mayor (sw. kommunstyrelsens ordförande). The current mayor is Henrik Thunes, of the Moderate Party.

2022 election results
In the 2022 municipal elections, the council's seat composition was the following:

2018 election results
In the 2018 municipal elections, the council's seat composition was the following:

2014 election results
In the 2014 municipal elections, the council's seat composition was the following:

2010 election results
In the 2010 municipal elections, the council's seat composition was the following:

2006 election results
In the 2006 municipal elections, the council's seat composition was the following:

2002 election results
In the 2002 municipal elections, the council's seat composition was the following:

List of mayors since 1971
(1971–1974) Urban Gibson (fp)
(1974–1977) Carl-Erik Nilsson (c)
(1977–1980) Sven Olle Isidor Persson (s)
(1980–1987) Jan-Olov Sundström (m)
(1987–1998) Gun Blomberg (m)
(1998–2000) Christina Naess (m)
(2000–2010) Torbjörn Rosdahl (m)
(2010-2015-07-11) Douglas Lithborn (m) 
(2015-07-12- 2015-09-16) Anna Lena Johansson (fp) 
2015-09-17- Henrik Thunes (m)

Public transport
Sollentuna is served by the Stockholm public transport system. Stockholm commuter rail has five stations within the municipality. There is also an extensive SL bus network.

Sights

Edsbacka krog, located by Edsbacka lake and founded already in 1634, was the only Swedish restaurant with two stars in the Michelin Guide until it closed in February 2010. Now the site has a slightly less fancy restaurant, again under the name, Edsbacka Krog   
Edsbergs slott was built in the rococo style in 1760. It's 400 km²
Probable burial mound of King Agne from the 5th century.

Sports

Sollentunavallen is the biggest playing field. It consists of two fields. The main arena is for football and athletics. Alongside it, there's a field with artificial grass, which is used for bandy during the winter season.

The following sports clubs are located in Sollentuna Municipality:
 Sollentuna Volleybollklubb
 Rotebro IS FF
 Sollentuna FK
 Konståkningsklubben Sollentuna
 Turebergs FK
 Helenelunds IK
 Sollentuna HC
 SKIFT

As of December 2022 there are 64 sports clubs in Sollentuna. The full list is maintained on the municipality web site.

Notable people
Jonas Bane, actor
Kajsa Bergqvist, high jump world champion
Thomas Bodström, football player, politician, former minister of justice
Ted Gärdestad, pop musician
Maia Hirasawa, musician
Patric Hörnqvist, ice hockey player currently with the Florida Panthers of the NHL
Jonatan Johansson, snowboarder
Ulrika Jonsson, television presenter
Charlotte Lindström, former model who was charged in 2007 for ordering a hitman to kill two witnesses in Australia
Johan Munck, Chief Justice of Sweden
Christer Pettersson, Olof Palme murder suspect
Rickard Rakell, ice hockey player currently with the Pittsburgh Penguins of the NHL
Emilia Andersson Ramboldt, ice hockey player and former captain of the Swedish women's national team
Rednex, country pop group
Lovisa Selander, ice hockey goaltender for the Boston Pride and the Swedish women's national team
Farhad Shakely, poet
Linda Skugge, writer
Mats Sundin, professional ice hockey player
Niklas Svedberg, professional ice hockey goaltender
Caroline Winberg, model
Mia Mulder, video essayist, activist, podcaster

International relations

Twin towns — sister cities
The municipality is twinned with:

 Hvidovre in Denmark
 Saue in Estonia
 Tuusula in Finland
 Oppegård in Norway

See also
Sollentuna Hundred

References

External links

Sollentuna Municipality - Official site

 
Municipalities of Stockholm County
Metropolitan Stockholm
Stockholm urban area
Municipal seats of Stockholm County
Swedish municipal seats
Populated places in Stockholm County